Pseudotetracha hopei is a species of tiger beetle in the subfamily Cicindelinae that was described by Laporte in 1867, and is endemic to Australia.

References

Beetles described in 1867
Endemic fauna of Australia
Beetles of Australia